Gerhard "Gerd" Müller (3 November 1945 – 15 August 2021) was a German professional footballer. A striker renowned for his clinical finishing, especially in and around the six-yard box, he is widely regarded as one of the greatest goalscorers in the history of the sport. With success at club and international level, he is one of nine players to have won the FIFA World Cup, the UEFA Champions League and the Ballon d'Or.

At international level with West Germany, he scored 68 goals in 62 appearances, and at club level, in 15 years with Bayern Munich in which he scored 365 goals in 427 Bundesliga matches, he became – and still is – record holder of that league. In 74 European club games he scored 65 goals. Averaging over a goal a game with West Germany, Müller was, as of 11 July 2021, 21st on the list of all time international goalscorers, despite playing fewer matches than every other player in the top 48. Among the top scorers, he has the third-highest goal-to-game ratio. He also had the highest ratio of 0.97 goals per game in the European Cup, scoring 34 goals in 35 matches.

Nicknamed "Bomber der Nation" ("the nation's Bomber") or simply "Der Bomber", Müller was named European Footballer of the Year in 1970. After a successful season at Bayern Munich, he scored ten goals at the 1970 FIFA World Cup for West Germany where he received the Golden Boot as top goalscorer, before winning the 1970 Ballon d'Or. In 1972, he won the UEFA European Championship and was the top goalscorer, scoring two goals in the final. Two years later, he scored four goals in the 1974 World Cup, including the winning goal in the final.

Müller held the all-time goal-scoring record in the World Cup with 14 goals for 32 years. In 1999, Müller was ranked ninth in the European player of the Century election held by the International Federation of Football History & Statistics (IFFHS), and he was voted 13th in the IFFHS' World Player of the Century election. In 2004, Pelé named Müller in the FIFA 100 list of the world's greatest living players.

Club career

Bayern Munich

Born in Nördlingen, Germany, Müller began his football career at his hometown club TSV 1861 Nördlingen. Müller joined Bayern Munich in 1964, where he teamed up with future stars Franz Beckenbauer and Sepp Maier. The club, which would go on to become the most successful German club in history, was then still in the Regionalliga Süd (Regional League South), which was one level below the Bundesliga at the time. After one season, Bayern Munich advanced to the Bundesliga and started a long string of successes. With his club, Müller amassed titles during the 1960s and 1970s: he won the German Championship four times, the DFB-Pokal four times, the European Champions' Cup three consecutive years (the first West German team to win it; Müller scored in the 1974 final replay and the 1975 final), the Intercontinental Cup once, and the European Cup Winners' Cup once.

An opportunistic goal-scorer, Müller also became German top scorer seven times and European top scorer twice. Müller scored 365 goals in 427 Bundesliga matches for Bayern Munich, 53 goals over the second-most successful Bundesliga scorer, Robert Lewandowski. He held the single-season Bundesliga record with 40 goals in season 1971–72, a record that would be held until Lewandowski scored 41 goals during the 2020–21 season. Müller averaged a goal per game or better in seven of his 14 seasons. He scored 68 goals in 62 German international games. He held the record for most goals scored in a calendar year, striking 85 goals in 1972, until his total was surpassed 40 years later in 2012 by Lionel Messi.

Fort Lauderdale Strikers
After his career in the Bundesliga Müller went to the United States, where he joined the Fort Lauderdale Strikers (based in the Miami area) of the North American Soccer League (NASL) in 1979. He played three seasons with this team, scoring 38 goals, and reaching, but losing, the league final in 1980.

International career

Müller scored 68 goals in 62 games for West Germany. He was Germany's all-time leading scorer for almost 40 years until surpassed by Miroslav Klose in 2014, though Klose required over double the number of caps to do so, scoring his 69th goal in his 132nd appearance. Müller's international career started in 1966 and ended on 7 July 1974 with victory at the 1974 World Cup at his home stadium in Munich. He scored the winning goal for the 2–1 victory over Johan Cruyff's Netherlands in the final. His four goals in that tournament and his ten goals at the 1970 World Cup combined made him the all-time highest World Cup goalscorer at the time with 14 goals. His record stood until the 2006 tournament, coincidentally held in Germany, when it was broken by Brazilian striker Ronaldo, who also required more matches than Müller to achieve his tally. Müller also participated in the 1972 European Championship, becoming top scorer with four goals (including two in the final) and winning the Championship with the West German team.

Müller quit playing for West Germany after the 1974 World Cup triumph following an argument with the German Football Association at the post-tournament celebration, when officials' wives were allowed to attend but players' wives were not.

Life after football

After Müller ended his career in 1982, he fell into a slump and suffered from alcoholism. However, his former companions at Bayern Munich convinced him to go through alcohol rehabilitation. When he emerged, they gave him a job as a coach at Bayern Munich II. He held the position from 1992 until he retired in 2014 due to health problems. There is also a collection of apparel released by sporting giants Adidas under the Gerd Müller name. It is part of the Adidas originals series. In July 2008, the Rieser Sportpark, in Nördlingen, where Müller had begun his career, was renamed the Gerd-Müller-Stadion in his honour.

On 6 October 2015, it was announced that Müller was suffering from Alzheimer's disease. He died on 15 August 2021 in a nursing home in Wolfratshausen, aged 75.

Style of play
In his book, Brilliant Orange: The Neurotic Genius of Dutch Football, author David Winner writes, "Müller was short, squat, awkward-looking and not notably fast; he never fitted the conventional idea of a great footballer, but he had lethal acceleration over short distances, a remarkable aerial game, and uncanny goalscoring instincts. His short legs gave him a low center of gravity, so he could turn quickly and with perfect balance in spaces and at speeds that would cause other players to fall over. He also had a knack of scoring in unlikely situations."

Müller used extreme acceleration and deceptive changes of pace to get to loose balls first, and bypass defenders. His teammate Franz Beckenbauer has emphasized Müller's unusual speed: "His pace was incredible. In training I have played against him and I never had a chance."

Career statistics

Club
A goals tally in bold indicates that Müller was the competition's top scorer for that season.

International

Müller scored 68 goals in 62 games for West Germany. His 14 goals in FIFA World Cup tournaments were a record between 1974 and 2006. This score was bettered in 2006 by Brazil's Ronaldo, and eight years later by German Miroslav Klose, who also broke Müller's record for goals for Germany. However, Müller managed to score eight hat-tricks in his international career.

Honours
Bayern Munich
 Regionalliga Süd: 1964–65
 Bundesliga: 1968–69, 1971–72, 1972–73, 1973–74
 DFB-Pokal: 1965–66, 1966–67, 1968–69, 1970–71
 European Cup: 1973–74, 1974–75, 1975–76
 European Cup Winners' Cup: 1966–67
 Intercontinental Cup: 1976

West Germany
 FIFA World Cup: 1974
 UEFA European Championship: 1972

Individual
 Ballon d'Or: 1970; runner-up: 1972; third place: 1969, 1973
 Footballer of the Year (Germany): 1967, 1969
 Voted best Player 40 Years Bundesliga 1963–2003
 kicker Bundesliga Team of the Season: 1968–69, 1969–70, 1971–72, 1972–73
 Eric Batty's World XI: 1969, 1971, 1972, 1973, 1974, 1976, 1977, 1978
 Bundesliga Top Scorer (Kicker-Torjägerkanone): 1967, 1969, 1970, 1972, 1973, 1974, 1978
 European Golden Shoe: 1969–70, 1971–72
 FIFA World Cup Golden Boot: 1970

 FIFA World Cup All-Star Team: 1970
 FIFA Selects World XI: 1971, 1972, 1973
 Worldwide Topscorer: 1970, 1972
 UEFA European Championship Top Scorer: 1972
 UEFA European Championship Team of the Tournament: 1972
 European Cup Top Scorer: 1973, 1974, 1975, 1977
 Onze de Onze: 1976

 FIFA Order of Merit: 1998
 FIFA 100: 2004
 Golden Foot: 2007, as football legend
 Bravo Otto: Gold award: 1973, 1974; Silver award: 1975; Bronze award: 1972, 1976
 IFFHS Legends
 Bayern Munich All-time XI
 IFFHS All-time Men's B Dream Team: 2021
 IFFHS All-time Europe Men's Dream Team: 2021

See also 
 List of men's footballers with 500 or more goals

Notes

References

External links

 Gerd Müller – Player profile at FIFA.com
 
 
 Portrait of Gerd Müller at FIFA.com
 Statistics on Müller's matches and goals at RSSSF

1945 births
2021 deaths
1970 FIFA World Cup players
1974 FIFA World Cup players
Association football forwards
Ballon d'Or winners
Expatriate soccer players in the United States
FC Bayern Munich footballers
FC Bayern Munich non-playing staff
FIFA 100
FIFA World Cup-winning players
Fort Lauderdale Strikers (1977–1983) players
Bundesliga players
West German expatriate sportspeople in the United States
German footballers
Germany international footballers
Germany under-21 international footballers
Kicker-Torjägerkanone Award winners
North American Soccer League (1968–1984) players
People from Nördlingen
Sportspeople from Swabia (Bavaria)
Recipients of the Cross of the Order of Merit of the Federal Republic of Germany
Footballers from Bavaria
UEFA Euro 1972 players
UEFA European Championship-winning players
UEFA Champions League top scorers
Deaths from dementia in Germany
Deaths from Alzheimer's disease
West German expatriate footballers
West German footballers
TSV 1861 Nördlingen players
UEFA Champions League winning players